Alessandro Bonsanti (November 25, 1904 in Florence – February 17, 1984 in Florence) was a writer and Italian politician.

Biography 
Alessandro Bonsanti, writer, was born in Florence. Very young, after completing his studies, he moved to work in Milan, where he worked for three years as an employee at a local bank, collaborating in the magazine La Fiera Literaria, where he published his first Brigants story in Maremma.

Returning to Florence, he came into contact with the literary environment that animated Solaria (the European magazine, which existed from 1926 to 1936), who was a collaborator and director, publishing military narrative (1927) The loving servant (1929) and the whims of 'Adriana (1934), republished in distant Racconti 1962, texts of the past that have to do with a distant social history. In 1937 Bonsanti founded and assumed the direction of publishing at a magazine that collected the inheritance of Solaria.

In 1941 he took over as la direzione del Gabinetto scientifìco-letterario Vieusseux (Director of the Vieusseux Scientific-Literature Cabinet), left vacant by Eugenio Montale. This was a prestigious assignment that Bonsanti held with great willingness and firmness, making for almost forty years an untiring promoter of various cultural initiatives.

During the war, he published two books: Dialoghi e altre prose (Dialogues and Other Prose) (1940) and Introduzione al gran viaggio (Introduction to the Great Trip) (1944). The following year he assumed the position of Director of Il Mondo, which he himself founded with Eugenio Montale and Arturo Loria. Other books to remember are: La vipera e il toro (1955) and cavalli di bronzo (1956).

In recent years Bonsanti's interests were also addressed to active politics; in this period he was approaching the Republican Party of Spadolini and in 1983 was elected mayor of Florence, head of a pentapartito junta, which was not completed due to his death in 1984.

His daughter Sandra, a journalist, was a member of the Republic.

Alessandro Bonsanti is buried in the Cimitero delle Porte Sante in Florence.

He was nominated for the Strega Prize.

Main works 
 La serva amorosa, Firenze, 1929
 I capricci dell'Adriana, Firenze, 1934
 Racconto militare, Firenze, 1937
 Dialoghi e altre prose, Firenze, 1940
 Introduzione al gran viaggio, Roma, 1944
 La vipera e il toro, Firenze, 1955
 Sopra alcuni personaggi eventuali, Sarzana, 1956
 I cavalli di bronzo, Firenze, 1956
 Racconti lontani, Milano, 1962
 La buca di San Colombario, 4 vol., Milano, 1964–1973
 La nuova stazione di Firenze, Milano, 1965
 Teatro domestico, Milano, 1970
 Portolani d'agosto, Milano, 1978

References 

1904 births
1984 deaths
Writers from Florence
Mayors of Florence
20th-century Italian male writers
Italian magazine founders